Moruț may refer to several villages in Romania:

 Moruț, a village in Matei Commune, Bistrița-Năsăud County
 Moruț, a village in the town of Sărmașu, Mureș County